Oscar August Roels (2 November 1864, in Ghent – 29 October 1938, in Ghent) was a Flemish composer and conductor.

He was a student of Adolphe Samuel and Karel Miry at the Royal Conservatory of Ghent. Later on, he became a teacher at this institute, where he also conducted its choir and orchestra. As a student, he played the organ at the Jesuit church of Ghent, and later on he became an organist at the Saint-Barbaracollege. As a conductor, he worked at the Royal Opera of Ghent and the Royal Dutch Theatre of Antwerp. Aside of these, he also conducted several choir- and concert-societies of Ghent, including the Société Royale des Mélomanes.

Roels oeuvre contains theater music, operettas, orchestral works, chamber music, songs, and pieces for organ.

Honours 
 1919 : Officer of the Order of Leopold.

List of works

Sonata for viola and piano (1927)
De Vlaamsche Nacht
Zangersgroet
Pinksternacht
De witte kaproenen
Clodwig en Clothildis
Achter 't slot

References

Sources
Jan Dewilde. Biography at SVM

1864 births
1939 deaths
Belgian classical composers
Belgian male classical composers